The 2016 Texas A&M–Commerce Lions football team represented Texas A&M University–Commerce as a member of the Lone Star Conference (LSC) during the 2016 NCAA Division II football season. Led by fourth-year head coach Colby Carthel, the Lions compiled an overall record of 11–2 with a mark of 8–1 in conference play, winning the LSC title for the third consecutive season. Texas A&M–Commerce advanced to the NCAA Division II Football Championship playoffs for the fifth time in program history. The Lions were ranked No. 9 in the final AFCA poll.

Texas A&M–Commerce finished with both the top offense and top defense in the conference. The Lions scored a total of 477 points (39.8 per game) while only allowing 260 (21.7 per game). On offense, the team was led by junior quarterback Luis Perez, who finished the season throwing for 3,326 yards, 32 touchdowns, and five interceptions.

The Lions played their home games at Memorial Stadium on the university's campus in Commerce, Texas.

Previous season
The 2015 team finished 8–4, 6–0 in conference play, being named Lone Star Conference champions. In the LSC playoffs, the Lions were the number one seed, defeating fourth-seed Angelo State 36–35 in game one, before losing to second-seed Midwestern State 33–37 in game two. The Lions qualified for the NCAA Division II playoffs, losing 30–48 to the Ferris State Bulldogs in the first round. The 2015 team was ranked No. 23 in the final AFCA poll.

Schedule

Personnel

Game summaries

University of Faith (FL)

Statistics

at Delta State

Statistics

at Eastern New Mexico

Statistics

Texas A&M–Kingsville

Statistics

at Oklahoma Panhandle State

Statistics

No. 7 Midwestern State

Statistics

at Western New Mexico

Statistics

at Angelo State

Statistics

West Texas A&M

Statistics

at Texas–Permian Basin

Statistics

Tarleton State

Statistics

No. 25 Colorado Mesa (NCAA Division II playoffs first round)

Statistics

at No. 2 Grand Valley State (Regional semifinals)

Statistics

Rankings

Statistics

Scoring
Scores against non-conference opponents

Scores against the Lonestar Conference

Scores against all opponents

References

Texas AandM-Commerce
Texas A&M–Commerce Lions football seasons
Lone Star Conference football champion seasons
Texas AandM-Commerce Lions football